Johnstown (March 12, 1936 – May 14, 1950) was an American Hall of Fame Thoroughbred racehorse who won two out of every three races he competed in.

Background
Johnstown was a bay horse bred at Claiborne Farm. He was purchased by William Woodward, Sr. and raced under his Belair Stable banner.

Racing career
After a successful season racing at age two when he won seven of his twelve starts, in the spring of 1939 Johnstown gave trainer Sunny Jim Fitzsimmons his third straight Wood Memorial Stakes, an important stepping stone to the U.S. Triple Crown races.

The heavy favorite going into the Kentucky Derby, Johnstown got off to a slow start under jockey James Stout, then he took command by the mile pole and defeated Challedon by eight lengths, tying the (still current, 2015) record for margin of victory. In the Preakness Stakes, it came up muddy (he never raced on an off-track before or after), and Johnstown finished 5th to winner Challedon. With Challedon not eligible for the Belmont Stakes, Johnstown easily won the final leg of the U.S. Triple Crown races. He later won several more important races and wound up his highly successful season with seven wins in nine starts.

Stud record
Retired to stud at Claiborne Farm, Johnstown met with modest success as a sire, producing winners of only six stakes races. However, he was a leading broodmare sire during the 1950s with his most famous offspring being Hall of Famer Nashua.

Johnstown died in 1950 at the age of fourteen and was buried in the equine cemetery at Claiborne Farm. He was posthumously inducted into the United States' National Museum of Racing and Hall of Fame in 1992. His portrait by artist Martin Stainforth can be seen as part of the museum's equine collection.

Pedigree

See also
 List of historical horses

References

 Johnstown's pedigree and racing stats
 Details of Johnstown's 1939 Kentucky Derby victory
 Johnstown at the United States' National Museum of Racing and Hall of Fame

1936 racehorse births
1950 racehorse deaths
Racehorses bred in Kentucky
Racehorses trained in the United States
Kentucky Derby winners
Belmont Stakes winners
United States Thoroughbred Racing Hall of Fame inductees
Hancock family
Thoroughbred family 17-b